John Vincent is a former American football coach.  He was the 18th head football coach at Fort Hays State University in Hays, Kansas, serving for five seasons, from 1985 to 1989, and compiling a record of 22–26–2.

Head coaching record

References

Year of birth missing (living people)
Living people
Fort Hays State Tigers football coaches